Hirudisomatidae is a family of colobognathan millipedes in the order Polyzoniida. The approximately 20 species occur from Spain to the Himalayas in Eurasia, Japan, and in North America from southwest Canada to central Mexico.

Genera
Catharosoma
Hirudisoma
Hypozonium
Mexiconium
Nepalozonium
Octoglena
Orsiboe

References

Millipede families
Polyzoniida
Taxa named by Filippo Silvestri